Keith "Grell" Griffith (born 1947 ) is a former professional international footballer from Barbados and current technical director of the US Virgin Islands national soccer team.  Prior to his current position, Griffith was coach of the Barbados national football team, Trinidad and Tobago's Joe Public F.C., and technical director of Antigua and Barbuda, Anguilla, and the Cayman Islands. Griffith has been called a "well-known hero on the Caribbean scene."

References

1947 births
Living people
TT Pro League managers
Barbadian footballers
Barbadian football managers
Barbados international footballers
Barbados national football team managers
United States Virgin Islands national soccer team managers
Association footballers not categorized by position
Joe Public F.C. managers